

Pterosaurs

New taxa

References

1800s in paleontology
Paleontology